Ögii Nuur may refer to
 Ögii Lake (nuur = lake), in Mongolia
 Ögii Nuur District, in Mongolia